Kyrkslätt Idrottsföreningen (abbreviated KyIF and also known as Kyrkslätt IF) is a sports club from Kirkkonummi, Finland. The club was formed on 9 November 1924 and covers the sports of football, handball, skiing, alpine sports, gymnastics, horse riding, athletics and volleyball.

Football

Background

The football section is known as FC Kirkkonummi (abbreviated FCK) and in the period 2003 until 2007 was known as FC Kirkkonummen Salamat . The men's first team currently plays in the Kolmonen (Third Division) and their home ground is at the Kirkkonummen Keskusnurmi..  The Chairman of FCK is Gustaf Åberg.

The club has played five seasons in the Kakkonen (Second Division), the third tier of Finnish football, in 1994–95 and 2003–05.

FCK is the largest football club in Kirkkonummi. The other clubs in the area are Masala Kisa who are based in Masala and Veikkolan Veikot who are situated in Veikkola.  In addition there is the women’s football club known as AC Kirkkonummi.

Season to Season

Club Structure

Kyrkslätts Idrottsförening run a large number of football teams including 2 men's teams, 1 veteran’s team and 23 boys teams in a very active youth section.

2010 season

For the current season KyIF FCK1 are competing in Section 1 (Lohko 1) of the Kolmonen administered by the Helsinki SPL and Uusimaa SPL.  This is the fourth highest tier in the Finnish football system.

KyIF FCK2 are participating in Section 1 (Lohko 1) of the Vitonen administered by the Uusimaa SPL.

References and sources
Official Website
Official Website of the Football Club
Finnish Wikipedia

Footnotes

Football clubs in Finland
Kirkkonummi
1924 establishments in Finland